The Dream of Enlightenment: The Rise of Modern Philosophy is a 2016 nonfiction book by Anthony Gottlieb, a former editor of The Economist. It is a sequel to his 2001 nonfiction, The Dream of Reason: A History of Philosophy from the Greeks to the Renaissance.

Content
The book is the second volume in a series of three written as an introduction to Western philosophy for a broad audience. In his 2000 publication, The Dream of Reason: A History of Philosophy from the Greeks to the Renaissance, Gottlieb described the first of two explosions of thought that contributed to western philosophical traditionsstarting with the Athenian philosophers, Socrates, Plato, and Aristotle. In The Dream of Enlightenment, Gottlieb describes the second "burst" starting with René Descartes, then Thomas Hobbes, Baruch Spinoza, John Locke, Gottfried Leibniz, David Hume, Voltaire, Jean-Jacques Rousseau, and the philosophes. Gottlieb describes how these two "staccato bursts"each one only lasting for 150 yearscontained the essence of two and a half millennia of Western philosophy. 
The first volume in the trilogy is The Dream of Reason which begins with the Greek philosophers and ends with the Renaissance, was published in 2000. In The Dream of the Enlightenment, Gottlieb "picks up the story" from the time of Descartes in the 17th century and continues through to the French Revolution. in which he "skillfully juggle[d]" aspects of the biographies of European philosophers against the backdrop of intellectual, political, and scientific transformations.

Reviews
 
The Guardians reviewer described this book as the "much-anticipated sequel" to the 2000 The Dream of Reason that is both "well-written and fast-moving".
The Australian Book Review 

See also
 A History of Philosophy by Frederick Copleston
 A History of Western Philosophy by Bertrand Russell 
 A New History of Western Philosophy by Anthony Kenny
 The Dream of Reason (2000) by Anthony Gottlieb

Notes

Citations

ReferencesG 
 
 
 
 
 
 P R S'
 
 

2016 non-fiction books
W. W. Norton & Company books